In a packet switched network, burst switching is a capability in which each network switch extracts routing instructions from an incoming packet header to establish and maintain the appropriate switch connection for the duration of the packet, following which the connection is automatically released. 

In concept, burst switching is similar to connectionless mode transmission, but differs in that burst switching implies an intent to establish the switch connection in near real time so that only minimum buffering is required at the node switch.

A variant of burst switching used in optical networks is optical burst switching.

References

Source: from Federal Standard 1037C.

Computer networks